West Kildonan is a residential suburb within the Old Kildonan and Mynarski city wards of Winnipeg, Manitoba, lying on the west side of the Red River, and immediately north of the old City of Winnipeg in the north-central part of the city.

It is bounded by the Red River on the east; the north limit of Kildonan Golf Course, Main Street, Seaforth Avenue, the Canadian Pacific Railway Winnipeg Beach Subdivision, and Templeton Avenue on the north; McPhillips Street on the west; and Carruthers Avenue, McGregor Street, and the lane between McAdam and Smithfield Avenues on the south.

It is notably home to Kildonan Park, West Kildonan Collegiate, and the former West Kildonan North Stars.

History

The Battle of Seven Oaks was fought in what is now West Kildonan in 1816. The area was part of the original Municipality of Kildonan, which was established in 1876. Kildonan was divided in eastern and western halves in 1914 and the more heavily developed areas of West Kildonan separated from areas which remained primarily rural (Old Kildonan) to assume the current boundaries in 1921. West Kildonan is one of Winnipeg's earliest residential suburbs.

The areas east of the CPR Winnipeg Beach tracks and south of Hartford Avenue were substantially developed by the 1910s and 1920s. West of the tracks, the Garden City neighbourhood was developed in the 1950s and 1960s, as was the area north of Hartford Avenue east of the tracks. The Garden Park community located north of Leila Avenue and west of the CPR tracks was developed beginning in the late 1950s.

The R.M.'s municipal hall was located at 1760 Main St.

In January 1961 the Rural Municipality of West Kildonan asked the Province to designate it as a City. At the time the R.M. had a total tax assessment of C$15 million with a population of 19,000 citizens. Final approval by the Manitoba Legislature was given in April 1961 for the R.M. of West Kildonan and the Town of Transcona to formally become cities via minor amendments to their respective municipal and provincial Acts. The first council meeting operating as the City of West Kildonan took place on April 25, 1961. Prior to 1972, it was the independent City of West Kildonan. Today, it is a popular suburb of the City of Winnipeg.

Demographics

Early on, West Kildonan attracted many people from Winnipeg's working class North End who became more affluent beginning after World War I, but who wished to remain close to their roots. To this day, the area has a large Eastern European population.

This area, along with nearby Garden City are home to large portions of Winnipeg's Jewish population. Historically, the West Kildonan and Garden City areas have been two of Canada's largest Jewish neighbourhoods. Synagogues, Hebrew educational programming, Kosher supermarkets and Jewish cemeteries are common throughout the area. In recent years condominiums catering to the Jewish community have become increasingly popular.

See also 
Garden City
Winnipeg

References 

Kildonan, Winnipeg
Seven Oaks, Winnipeg
Former municipalities now in Winnipeg
Jewish Canadian history
Jewish communities in Canada
Jews and Judaism in Winnipeg
Neighbourhoods in Winnipeg
Populated places disestablished in 1972